NGC 4372 (also known as Caldwell 108) is a globular cluster in the southern constellation of Musca. It is southwest of γ Muscae (Gamma Muscae) and west of the southern end of the Dark Doodad Nebula (Sandqvist 149), a 3° thin streak of black across a southern section of the great plane of the Milky Way.

NGC 4372 "is partially obscured by dust lanes, but still appears as a large object some 10 arcseconds in diameter," according to Astronomy of the Milky Way (2004). 

The cluster has highly peculiar chemistry similar to NGC 5694, being extremely iron-poor yet having super-solar abundances of magnesium and titanium.

References

External links
 
 NGC 4372 at Wikisky
 NGC 4372 at Astrosurf
 
 

Globular clusters
Musca (constellation)
4372
108b